Adassil is a town and rural commune in Chichaoua Province of the Marrakesh-Safi region of Morocco. At the time of the 2004 census, the commune had a population of 7,219 living in 1,323 households.

References

Populated places in Chichaoua Province
Rural communes of Marrakesh-Safi